Kepler-65 is a subgiant star slightly more massive than the Sun and has at least four planets.

Planetary system
Three transiting planets were announced in 2013. A fourth non-transiting planet was discovered using radial velocity measurements in 2019. The first three planets orbit very close to their star. Initial follow-up radial velocity measurements provided data too noisy to constrain the mass of planets. Follow-up transit-timing variation analysis helped to measure the mass of Kepler-65d which revealed that it has significantly lower density than Earth.

External links
Kepler-65 System
Kepler-65, The Open Exoplanet Catalogue

References

Lyra (constellation)
85
Planetary transit variables
Planetary systems with four confirmed planets
F-type subgiants